The East Afghan montane conifer forests ecoregion (WWF ID: PA0506) covers a series of unconnected conifer forests along the border between Afghanistan and Pakistan, at elevations of  to  above sea level. The ecoregion supports the near-threatened Markhor (Capra falconeri chiltanensis), known as the Screw-horned goat, the national animal of Pakistan.  The forests of the ecoregion have been heavily thinned for timber.

Location and description 

The northernmost sector is the smallest, lying on the southern edge of the Hindu Kush mountains, in Nuristan Province about 60 km north of Jalalabad. This subregion is bounded on the north and south by the Hindu Kush alpine meadow ecoregion, and on the west and east by the drier Baluchistan xeric woodlands.  The middle sector is centered in Paktia Province, south of Kabul.  It covers the mountains east of the Gardez valley.  The southern sector of the ecorange is in the mountains above Quetta and Kuchlak in Pakistan. 

The soil in the northern area is gravel and organic matter over a clay substrate.  In the south, the bedrock is limestone.

Climate 
The climate of the ecoregion is Humid continental climate, warm summer (Köppen climate classification (Dfb)). Average precipitation in the ecoregion is 200-400 mm/year.

Flora and fauna 
Only about 40% of the ecoregion is covered in vegetation, generally shrubs, herbaceous cover, and open forest.  The forest type is mostly determined by altitude zones.  From 2,100-2,500 meters elevation the forest is drier, with Chilgoza pine (Pinus gerardiana), holly oak (Quercus baloot), species of the beech family (Fagaceae), and cedar (Cedrus).  Understory at this stage features Indigofera gerardiana (a legume) and Danewort (Sambucus ebulus).

From 2,500-3,100 meters, the rains from the monsoon are picked up and more deciduous trees are found among the conifers.  This forest may become dense, and includes Morinda spruce (Picea smithiana), Bhutan pine (Pinus wallichiana), Quercus semecarpifolia, and Himalayan cedar (Cedrus deodara).  Above 3,100 meters the forest transitions to more juniper (Juniperus seravschanica).  

The lakes of the northern sectors support a wide variety of migratory and breeding birds, including various species of rails (pochards, coots), marsh hens, black-necked grebe, and others.

Protected areas 
About 9% of the ecoregion is officially protected. These protected areas include:
 Hazarganji-Chiltan National Park
 Sasnamana Wildlife Sanctuary
 Zawarkhan Game Reserve
 Gogi Game Reserve
 Wam Game Reserve
 Nuristan National Park
The park in Nuristan Province, the northernmost sector of the ecoregion, was declared a National Park of Afghanistan in July 2020.  At the time, plans for facilities and support for tourism had not yet been announced.

See also
Environmental issues in Afghanistan

References 

Ecoregions of Afghanistan
Ecoregions of Pakistan
Palearctic ecoregions
Temperate coniferous forests